Christopher Key Chapple is an Indologist and scholar of the renouncing religions of India, namely yoga, Jainism and Buddhism. He is Doshi Professor of Indic and Comparative Theology at Loyola Marymount University, Los Angeles. He has written several books on the history and philosophy of yoga, and on the intersection of religion and ecology.

Life

Chapple received his bachelor's degree in comparative literature and religious studies at the State University of New York at Stony Brook in 1976. He went on to complete his master's degree in Buddhism (1978) and PhD in history of religions (1980) at Fordham University. He noted in an interview that he initially struggled to reconcile Buddhism's "emptiness" with Yoga's self-realisation, and commented that the Yogavasistha answered the debate on "the tension between emptiness and consciousness in superbly poetic verse." 

He has published numerous books and papers on the history and philosophy of Indian religions, and on the intersection of religion and ecology.

Chapple advises the International Summer School of Jain Studies, the Yale Forum on Religion and Ecology, the Ahimsa Center (Pomona), the Dharma Academy of North America (Berkeley), the Jain Studies Centre (SOAS), the South Asian Studies Association, and International School for Jain Studies (New Delhi). He founded the Masters Program in Yoga at Loyola Marymount University, where he is Doshi Professor of Indic and Comparative Theology.

Works

Yoga

 Karma and Creativity (1986, SUNY)
 Nonviolence to Animals, Earth, and Self in Asian Traditions (1993, SUNY)
 Reconciling Yogas (2003, SUNY)
 Yoga and the Luminous: Patanjali's Spiritual Path to Freedom (2008, SUNY)
 Living Landscapes: Meditations on the Elements in Hindu, Buddhist, and Jain Yogas (2020, SUNY)

Edited

  Yoga in Jainism (2015, Routledge) 
 Engaged Emancipation: Mind, Morals and Make-Believe in the Moksopaya/Yogavasistha (2016, with Aridam Chakrabarti, SUNY)

Religion and ecology

 Ecological Prospects: Religious, Scientific, and Aesthetic Perspectives (1994, SUNY)
 Hinduism and Ecology (2000, with Mary Evelyn Tucker, Harvard)
 Jainism and Ecology (2002, Harvard)
 Yoga and Ecology (2009, Deepak Heritage)
 In Praise of Mother Earth: The Prthivi Sukta of the Atharva Veda (2011, with O. P. Dwivedi)

References

External links

 Interview on Religion and Ecology

Year of birth missing (living people)
Living people
Indologists
Yoga scholars
Loyola Marymount University faculty
Stony Brook University alumni
Fordham University alumni